"New Thing from London Town" is a song by the synth-pop duo Sharpe & Numan, released as a single in October 1986. Composed by Bill Sharpe with lyrics by Roger Odell and featuring lead vocals by Gary Numan, it spent three weeks on the UK Singles Chart, peaking at number 52.

Musically similar to the duo's previous hit single "Change Your Mind", Sharpe and Numan recorded the song at Rock City Studios, Shepperton with synthesizers and drum programming by Sharpe and vocals by Numan. The track was completed to its finished form in five days. A version of the song with new lyrics by Numan was included on his 1986 album Strange Charm, released shortly after the single.

Track listing
7" single
"New Thing from London Town" – 3.30
"Time to Die" – 3.00

12" single
"New Thing from London Town" – 8.00
"Time to Die" – 4.10

References

1986 songs
1986 singles
Sharpe & Numan songs
Songs written by Bill Sharpe (musician)